The 2012 Professional Indoor Football League season was the inaugural season of the Professional Indoor Football League (PIFL). The regular season began March 10, 2012, and ended on June 16, 2012.  Each team played a 12-game schedule. The top 4 teams in the regular season standings commenced the playoffs on June 23.  The final was played June 30, with the Albany Panthers defeating the Richmond Raiders to win the inaugural championship.

Regular season standings

y - clinched home playoff game

x - clinched playoff spot

Playoffs

References

2012 Professional Indoor Football League season